The 2014 Grand Prix de Futsal was the ninth edition of the international futsal competition of the same kind as the FIFA Futsal World Cup but with invited nations and held annually in Brazil. It was first held in 2005.

Participating

AFC (2)
 
 

CONCACAF (2)
 
 

CONMEBOL (2)

Group stage

Group A

Group B

Final round

Semi-finals

5th place match

3rd place match

Final

Final standing

References

External links
Official website

2014
2014 in Brazilian football
2014 in futsal